The Bram Stoker Award for Best Long Fiction is an award presented by the Horror Writers Association (HWA) for "superior achievement" in horror writing for long fiction.

Winners and nominees
Nominees are listed below the winner(s) for each year.

Notes

References

External links
 Stoker Award on the HWA web page
 Graphical listing of all Bram Stoker award winners and nominees

Long Fiction
Novella awards
Bram Stoker Award for Best Long Fiction winners
Awards established in 1987
1987 establishments in the United States
English-language literary awards